The 2011 Women's Oceania Cup was the seventh edition of the women's field hockey tournament. It was held from 6–9 October in Hobart.

The tournament served as a qualifier for the 2012 Summer Olympics.

New Zealand won the tournament for the third time, defeating Australia in the three–game series by goal difference, after the teams finished equal on points. Despite the Hockeyroos' second-place finish, the 2011 Oceania Cup held two qualifying allocations for the Olympic Games, meaning both teams qualified.

Results
All times are local (AEDT).

Pool

Fixtures

Statistics

Final standings

Goalscorers

References

Women's Oceania Cup
Oceania Cup
Oceania Cup
International women's field hockey competitions hosted by Australia
Sport in Hobart
Oceania Cup